The siege of Scutari, also referred to as the siege of Shkodër , known in Turkish as İşkodra Müdafaası   or İşkodra Savunması , took place from  28 October 1912 to 23 April 1913 when the army of Kingdom of Montenegro defeated the forces of the Ottoman Empire and invaded Shkodër.

Background
In 1912, the Balkan League consisting of Serbia, Montenegro, Greece and Bulgaria had jointly declared war against the Ottoman Empire. Montenegro mobilized its troops and prepared to attack the Ottoman forces in Albania directly to the south. Behind the invasion, however, stood Montenegro's intention to expand its border at the expense of territories with an overwhelming majority of Albanians. Montenegro considered itself the successor of Zeta, a medieval Slavic realm, with Shkodër as its capital. With the transition of power from the last feudal lords Balšići or Balsha to Venetians, and eventually Ottomans, who established a city as an administrative center of the region, the "lost capital" became a symbol of oppression for the Montenegrins.

Start of the war
On 8 October 1912, Turkish GeneralHasan Riza Pasha announced that Montenegro had declared war on the Ottoman Empire in order to erase 600 years of oppression by the "Turkish foot", as the enemy claimed, and that its troops were crossing the border between Montenegro and Albania. Two hours after the news, the Montenegrin troops, as expected, approached Scutari. As much as 70% of the Turkish army in the interior of the Balkans was composed of Muslim Albanians conscripted during the freedom struggle from the Ottoman Empire. At noon, Hasan Riza Pasha gathered all his commanders in his headquarters and told them:

Siege

The siege of Scutari was initiated by the Montenegrins on 28 October 1912. The initial attack was carried out by the Montenegrin army under the command of Prince Danilo and encountered stiff resistance. As the conflict settled into siege warfare, the Montenegrins were supported by reinforcements from their Serbian allies. Radomir Vešović, a Montenegrin army officer participated in the siege where he was wounded twice, for which he earned a golden Obilić Medal and the nickname the knight of Brdanjolt (Serbian: витез од Брдањолта).().

The combined Turkish and Albanian defenders of Scutari were led by Hasan Riza Pasha and his lieutenant, Essad Pasha. After the siege had continued for approximately three months, differences between the two Ottoman leaders boiled over on 30 January 1913, when Essad Pasha had two of his Albanian servants ambush and kill Riza Pasha. The ambush occurred as Riza Pasha left Essad's house after a dinner engagement and put Essad Pasha in total control of the Turkish forces at Scutari. Differences between the two men centered about the continued defense of the city. Riza Pasha desired to continue the fight against the Montenegrins and Serbs while Essad Pasha was a proponent of ending the siege by means of secret negotiations conducted with the counsel of the Russians. Essad Pasha's plan was to deliver Scutari to the Montenegrins and Serbs as the price for their support in his attempt to proclaim himself King of Albania.

The siege, however, continued and even escalated in February when King Nikola of Montenegro received a delegation of Malësian chieftains who stated their allegiance to him and volunteered to join the Montenegrin forces with 3,000 of their own soldiers. Shortly thereafter, the Malësian chieftains joined the war by assisting in the attack of the Jubani — Daut-age tower.

As Montengro continued their siege in April, the Great Powers decided to implement a blockade of their ports, which was declared on 10 April and lasted until 14 May 1913.
On 21 April 1913 approximately six months after the start of the siege, Essad Pasha offered an official proposal to surrender the city to Montenegrin General Vukotic. On 23 April, Essad Pasha's proposal was accepted and he was allowed to leave the city with full military honors and all of his troops and equipment, except the heavy guns. He also received a sum of £10,000 sterling from the Montenegrin King.

Essad Pasha surrendered Scutari to Montenegro only after its destiny had been decided, meaning after the Great Powers had forced Serbia to retreat and after it was obvious that the Great Powers would not allow Montenegro to keep Scutari. At the same time, Essad Pasha managed to get the support of Serbia and Montenegro for the new Kingdom of Albania, which would gain Scutari indirectly by the Great Powers.

Aftermath

The capture of Scutari by Montenegro and Serbia removed the only obstacle to a Serbian advance into Ottoman Albania. By November 1912, Albania had declared independence but was yet to be recognized by anyone. The Serbian army eventually occupied most of northern and central Albania, stopping north of the town of Vlorë. The Serbians also managed to trap the remains of the Army of Vardar in what was left of Albania proper, but were unable to force them to surrender.

When the war was over, however, the Great Powers did not award Scutari to the Kingdom of Montenegro, rather in accordance with the London Conference of Ambassadors compelled the Montenegrins to evacuate the city in May 1913. The Montenegrin army's withdrawal was hastened by a small naval flotilla of British and Italian gunboats that moved up the Bojana River and across the Adriatic coastline. An international peace keeping force (Scutari detachment) from five countries including Austria-Hungary, Great Britain, France, Italy and Germany was deployed in the city and kept until the start of World War I.

The International reaction to the ultimate settlement was somewhat mixed. Austria-Hungary's Foreign Minister, Count Leopold Berchtold, demanded that Scutari be evacuated by the Great Powers within 48 hours. The Kingdom of Italy supported Austria-Hungary and sent a part of the peace force. The Russian Empire supported Montenegro in its efforts to keep Scutari.

And finally as cultural outcomes of the siege, Albanian novelist Ndoc Nikaj wrote an historical novel titled Shkodra e rrethueme ("Shkodra under siege") in 1913 while Bosnian Serb poet Aleksa Šantić wrote To Essad Pasha, inspired by the siege of Scutari.

See also 
Serbia in the Balkan Wars
Massacres of Albanians in the Balkan Wars

Notes

Citations

References

Further reading

 
 
 
 Pavlović, Ž. (1926) The siege of Shkodra, 1912–1913. Belgrade 
 Ratković, B. (1975) The first Balkan war 1912–1913 - Operations of Serbian forces, Belgrade: Military History Institute, Vol. 2 
 Vojvodić, M.S. (1970) Skadar crisis in 1913, Belgrade

Battles involving Albania
Battles of the First Balkan War
Sieges involving Montenegro
Scutari 1912-1913
Scutari
1912 in Albania
1913 in Albania
1912 in the Ottoman Empire
1913 in the Ottoman Empire
Conflicts in 1913
Scutari vilayet
History of Shkodër
Modern history of Albania
Military history of Albania